My Darkest Days is the debut album by Canadian rock band My Darkest Days, released on September 21, 2010. The album has sold more than 100,000 copies in the US and more than 20,000 in Canada. The first single, "Porn Star Dancing", spent two weeks at number one the Billboard Mainstream Rock Tracks chart, and peaked at number seven on Billboards Rock Songs chart.

Track listing

Personnel
Per liner notes
My Darkest Days
Matt Walst – lead vocals, guitar
Brendan McMillan – bass guitar 
Doug Oliver – drums

Additional musicians
Joey Moi – strings, percussion, acoustic guitar, additional vocals
Chad Kroeger – acoustic guitar, additional vocals
Scott Cook – additional vocals
Ludacris – additional vocals

Charts

Weekly charts

Year-end charts

References 

2010 debut albums
My Darkest Days albums
604 Records albums
Albums produced by Joey Moi